Titanium(IV) hydride (systematically named titanium tetrahydride) is an inorganic compound with the empirical chemical formula . It has not yet been obtained in bulk, hence its bulk properties remain unknown. However, molecular titanium(IV) hydride has been isolated in solid gas matrices. The molecular form is a colourless gas, and very unstable toward thermal decomposition. As such the compound is not well characterised, although many of its properties have been calculated via computational chemistry.

Synthesis and stability
Rapid analysis was required as titanium(IV) hydride is extremely unstable. Computational analysis of  has given a theoretical bond dissociation energy (relative to M+4H) of 132 kcal/mole.

 (76 kcal/mole)

, along with other unstable molecular titanium hydrides, (TiH,  and polymeric species) has been isolated at low temperature following laser ablation of titanium.

Structure 
It is suspected that within solid titanium(IV) hydride, the molecules form aggregations (polymers), being connected by covalent bonds. Calculations suggest that  is prone to dimerisation. This largely attributed to the electron deficiency of the monomer and the small size of the hydride ligands; which allows dimerisation to take place with a very low energy barrier as there is a negligible increase in inter-ligand repulsion.

The dimer is a calculated to be a fluxional molecule rapidly inter-converting between a number of forms, all of which display bridging hydrogens. This is an example of three-center two-electron bonding.

Monomeric titanium(IV) hydride is the simplest transition metal molecule that displays sd3 orbital hybridisation.

References 

Titanium(IV) compounds
Metal hydrides